William Allen "Scrappy" Moore (December 16, 1892 – October 13, 1964) was a college baseball player at Georgia Tech and Vanderbilt as well as a professional baseball player. He played for the Atlanta team of the Southern Association from 1918 to 1919, and with the Little Rock Travelers in 1920.

References

Sources

Major League Baseball third basemen
St. Louis Browns players
1892 births
1964 deaths
Baseball players from Missouri
Georgia Tech Yellow Jackets baseball players
Atlanta Crackers players
Galveston Sand Crabs players
Shreveport Gassers players
Little Rock Travelers players
Chattanooga Lookouts managers
Vanderbilt Commodores baseball players